Naulong Dam is an embankment dam currently under construction on the Mula River, about 30 km from Gandawah City in Jhal Magsi district of Balochistan, Pakistan. Its Construction Contract has been awarded to Descon Engineering Limited, which is the biggest Contractor in Pakistan.

The zoned earth-filled dam is 186 feet high with a gross storage of 0.242 MAF and a command area of 47,000 acres.  It has a hydro power capacity of 4.4 MW.

History 
Feasibility studies for the dam were completed in 2009 and construction was planned to start the same year, for a completion in 2012. However, the project was heavily delayed, and the dam remains unbuilt by 2019. Works are expected to start by 2020.

See also 

List of dams and reservoirs in Pakistan

Notes 

Dams in Balochistan, Pakistan
Earth-filled dams
Hydroelectric power stations in Pakistan